The Kudumbi, also referred to as the Kunubis, the Kurumbi, or Kurmi, or the Kunbi, are traditionally a Konkani-speaking farming community residing in Kerala, India. The majority of the group are farmers, laborers, and petty workers, settled across central and southern Kerala. Kudumbis are part of the larger Kunbi–Kurmi diaspora, a generic farming community spread out over India, with the probable exception of only Jammu and Kashmir.

History

Goan legacy 
According to Goan historian Anant Ramakrishna Dhume, the Kunbi caste are modern descendants of ancient Mundari tribes. In his work, Dhume mentions several words of Mundari origin in the Konkani language and also elaborates on the deities worshipped by the ancient tribe, their customs, methods of farming, etc. The Portuguese, who ruled over Goa for over 500 years, considered the Kunbi, Velip and Gowada communities as Tribu, which means tribes. The Central Government failed to extend the Constitution (Scheduled Tribes) Order 1950 to the Union Territory of Goa, Daman, and Diu immediately after the liberation of Goa in 1961 and that was perceived as an injustice by many. Kunbis are included in ST list in Goa state in 2002. G. S. Ghurye says that "Kurmi, Kanbi and Kunbi perhaps signify the occupation of the group, viz., that of cultivation, though it is not improbable that the name may of tribal origin."

In 1510, Goa was captured by the Portuguese general Alfonso Albuquerque from the Adil Shah dynasty of Bijapur, and Portuguese rule was established. In 1545 St. Francis Xavier, sent a letter to John III of Portugal, requesting an Inquisition to be installed in Goa. The inquisitor's first act was to forbid any open practice of the Hindu faith on pain of death. The Portuguese colonial administration enacted anti-Hindu laws to encourage conversions to Christianity. Prohibition was laid upon Hindu rituals as well. In all, over 42 Hindu practices were prohibited. All the people above 15 years of age were compelled to listen to Christian preaching or otherwise be punished. Several Hindu temples were destroyed as well. An order was issued for suppressing the Konkani language and making it compulsory to speak the Portuguese language. The law provided for dealing toughly with anyone using the local language. Following that law all the non-Christian cultural symbols and the books written in local languages were sought out to be destroyed. In the first hundred years, the Inquisition burned 57 alive at the stake and 64 in effigy. Others were sentenced to various punishments, totalling 4,046. The Kudumbi were forced to migrate from Goa following religious persecution by the Portuguese during the said infamous Goa Inquisition. The Kudumbis, along with Gouda Saraswat Brahmins (Malayalam: ഗൌഡ് സാരസ്വത്), Daivajnas and Vaishya Vanis who wanted to preserve their religious and cultural identity, migrated from Goa along the west coast of India, primarily through sea voyages.

Some of the groups that fled Goa landed in coastal districts of state of Karnataka, that is, the Uttara Kannada, Dakshina Kannada and Udupi districts, and some groups voyaged further to Kerala.

The Census Report of India, 1961 – Volume VII, Kerala (page 210) refers to the Kudumbi community, and it is recorded that,
 "As to the fact that they were originally inhabitants of the area north Goa, there can be no doubt for the language, the ornament and the mode of dress of the woman show striking similarities with the present inhabitants of that area, proclaiming common origin. They are believed to have traveled by country crafts and landed at the sea port of towns Kerala which accounts for their concentration in places like Cranganore, Cochin, Parur, Kayamkulam, Alleppey, Purakkad and Quilon". A small number of the Kudumbi are also found in cities like Bangalore, Mangalore, Mumbai, and Delhi, particularly those members of the group who migrated from Kerala in search of better prospects and livelihood.

Early Cochin Princely State 
A group of Kudumbis may have migrated from Cochin to Travancore at the invitation of a Maharaja, Marthanda Varma and on arrival been given (free of tax) a coconut garden and land to grow rice. In return they were required to supply Avil to the palace and temple free of cost.

Current status
K. R. Gowri Amma, a prominent figure in the communist movement in Kerala and former Minister, in her autobiography narrates the backwardness of Kudumbi Community as:

V. K. Valath says that the main agricultural labourers in the islands around Kochi have been from the Pulaya and Kudumbi castes. He adds that, whilst many people of the Pulaya and Mukkuvar castes converted to Christianity during the Portuguese period, the Kudumbis retained their traditional religious beliefs.

The community is officially classified as being within the Socially and Economically Backward Communities (SEBC) by the State Government. Many students have utilised the benefits of reservation legislation to improve their lives. A mass struggle and hunger strike were organized by the social organization Kudumbi Seva Sanghom (KSS) during 2006–2007, demanding a 1% reservation for Kudumbis seeking admission to various professional courses in Kerala. In 2008 the State Government finally acceded to the demand vide GO (MS)No.95/08/SC/ST dated 06.10.2008. Further, the Kudumbi community is totally exempted from the creamy layer. Kudumbi Community is one among eight communities having hereditary occupations/calling, which had been excluded from the category of 'creamy layer' on account of its "Social Backwardness" as per GO (P) No.81/09/SCSTDD dated 26 September 2009.

Caste status 
The KIRTADS submitted a report stating that the Kudumbis should be included in the Scheduled Caste list.
After his election on 23 March 1987, and when challenged in court, K. Karunakaran, former chief minister of Kerala, supported inclusion of Kudumbis in the list. United Democratic Front (UDF)had assured to use maximum pressure on the center for including the Kudumbies in the SC list. However the legitimate claim of the Kudumbi Community stands in the ST list and not in SC List.
On 10 March 2008, Veerendra Kumar, member of parliament (MP) of the 14th Lok Sabha, writer and chairman and managing director of Mathrubhumi press, made mention before the parliament under rule 377 concerning the classification of the Kudumbis. He pointed to the community's poverty, low level of literacy, and lack of ability to take any important government position. On 4 May 2012, K. P. Dhanapalan MP, also made a special mention to the parliament about the classification of the Kudumbis. In December 2011 in New Delhi, and on 30 May 2012 in Kochi a public protest was organised by supporters of the rights of the Kudumbi, including the Janathipathiya Samrakshana Samithy (Association for Defence of Democracy, J.S.S.) to demand inclusion of the community in the list of Scheduled Castes.

In her autobiography, political activist, K. R. Gowri Amma wrote,
 "In the socio-political and in educational fields, the Kudumbis are backward... They have demanded that they be counted as scheduled castes. In reality their lot is worse than that of the scheduled castes."

Kudubis of Karnataka (who were migrated from Goa and settled in the coastal districts of Kartaka) are non-scheduled tribes. They are also suffering from problems including non-recognition as a tribe in Karnataka (Caste Practices and influences Affecting Tribals – A Case study of Kudubis of Karnataka by Dr. Y Ravindranath Rao) Kudubis of Karnataka has also urged state government to include them in the Scheduled Tribe list.

Cultural diffusion and language convergence
For decades the Kudumbi led a socially secluded life. During the late 19th century in Kerala, when a socio-cultural revival took place in many backward communities, the Kudumbi opened themselves up to mainstream socio-cultural and economic developments. Unfortunately, newer socio-economic and cultural changes in the community spurred a slow reverse cultural diffusion.

Kudumbi temples

According to Kerala tradition, the ceremony of Talapoli, as a procession of ladies carrying oil lamps accompanied by chenda (percussion instruments) or tappu melam, can be seen during the festivals in these devi temples. The traditional haampu  (multi-stacked portable brass lamp or a similar stone lamp) found in a number of Kudumbi temples is lit on special puja days. Votive items made from Aval (puffed rice) or beaten rice and jaggery are still offered as prasadam in many Kudumbi temples. Holi, the festival of colors, is celebrated in many Devi temples by the Kudumbi. During this festival, "Kamadeva" (Bodhan) the symbolic entity of "Kama" will be burnt to fire, purifying the life of all who participate in the festival. There will be a procession on the streets where all the participants will be applying colour each other, dancing with songs sung in Kudumbi language. Youngsters and children go in a group, pour yellow water from the pot kept in front of every house, and finally gather at their local devili temple. In the night there will be a special group dance by women (fuguda) by gathering in a circle and clapping and doing brisk movements. After this there will be delicious dinner and food will be offered to souls. Even Kudumbis of Karnataka, who had migrated from Goa along with their brethren in Kerala and other places continue to celebrate their traditional festival 'holi' by preserving their own unique culture.

See also
 Gauda and Kunbi
 Devendrakula Velalar

References

Sources
 The Kurmis-Kunbis of India by Pratap Singh Velip Kankar. Published by Pritam Publishers PajiFord, Margoa, Goa Year −2006.
 1956 An Introduction to the Study of Indian History (Popular Book Depot, Bombay) – D.D. Kosambi.
 Kudumbikalude Charithravum-Samskaravum – written by Dr. Vini M. Published by Sahithya Pravarthaka Cooperative Society, Kottayam, Kerala

Agricultural castes
Social groups of Kerala
Konkani people
Malayali people